Rathcoole is an outer suburban village, south-west of the city of Dublin, in the jurisdiction of South Dublin, Ireland.

Rathcoole is also a civil parish in the Barony of Newcastle.

Etymology
Ráth is the Irish word for a ringfort, a circular embankment often erected by wealthy farmers or local chiefs. There are several forts in the civil parish of Rathcoole, one in a field between the village and Saggart village.  There is no definite explanation for the name 'Rathcoole,' but it could well be Ráth Cumhaill meaning 'the ringfort of Cumhaill, the father of Fionn mac Cumhaill. Coole may also come from the Irish word for forest, "coill."

Location
Rathcoole lies in the southwest "corner" of the traditional County Dublin, just off the N7 national primary road, southwest of Citywest and west of Saggart village.  Close by to the north are Baldonnel and Casement Aerodrome, home of the Irish Air Corps.  Also in this part of the county are Newcastle and, further away, Brittas.

Geography 
Around Rathcoole are several streams, primarily draining the western end to the Griffeen River but south of the eastern end linking to the River Camac, both tributaries of the River Liffey.  Aside from the village core, the area has housing developments such as Beechwood Lawns, located between the main street and the park, Forest Hills, Broadfield Manor to the west, and Peyton to the south.

Historical notes
Like neighbouring Saggart and nearby Newcastle, Rathcoole was on the periphery of the Pale and was the site of many battles with mountain-based rebels, particularly the Byrnes and O'Tooles.

The village had a licence to hold a trading fair three times a year, a tradition that lapsed in the 19th century.

The village was the birthplace in 1765 of the United Irishman Felix Rourke, and another local, a member of the Clinch family of Rathcoole House, was executed after the 1798 rising. 

In the late 18th century Rathcoole was composed mainly of mud huts, and as late as the early 20th century it consisted of only one street.

Amenities
Rathcoole has a well-maintained landscaped park, run by South Dublin County Council, at the eastern end of the village.  There is also a community centre which caters for local events and training courses.

There is a small supermarket, a bank and a credit union, and two service stations on the N7.  One of Rathcoole's best-known pubs is An Poitin Stil, which is built on the site of an original inn dating back to 1649. The other pubs in the area are Muldowneys, Baurnafea House, and The Rathcoole Inn. 

A pub existed for many years a short distance outside the town on the Naas Road (now N7) named The Blackchurch Inn. On 11 November 2019 it was closed temporarily by the Food Safety Authority of Ireland due to high levels of E.coli and coliforms which were found in drinking water and ice samples during an inspection, but re-opened some days later. The pub is closed as of April 2022.

Rathcoole House
Rathcoole is home to Rathcoole House, which was part of a wider estate.  The house was built in 1750 and initially belonged to the Clinch family, later passing to the Sheils of Coolmine, who owned it from 1831 to 1962. The house had two main floors above ground and five bays, with a kitchen, milling room and stores in the basement, and a hall, dining room and drawing room on the ground floor. Part of the house was demolished in 1933 and was bought in 2013 by a private investor. It has since been developed into 5 residential properties.

Education 
Holy Family Community School at the western end of the village recently celebrated its fortieth anniversary. It is a secondary school for students from Rathcoole and those commuting from the nearby towns of Clondalkin and Tallaght and the villages of Saggart and Brittas. There is also Holy Family National School located at the western end of Forest Hills, and a Gaelscoil, Scoil Chrónáin, in Rathcoole village itself.

Sport
The Rathcoole soccer club is known as "Rathcoole football club". The well-known GAA club "Commercials Hurling Club" is located just off the Naas Road.  The local basketball club is known as "Rathcoole Rockets".  

Rathcoole is close to two golf courses: Citywest and Beech Park. 

Coolmine Equestrian Centre was established here in 1989, providing horse riding lessons and guided horseback trips. This equestrian centre welcomes international guests here on educational programmes, work experience and holidays. The centre became an Equestrian Academy and is now known locally as CEAD-Ireland. The Academy hosts festivals during the summer, with dance, music, pony rides, pet farms, dog shows and equestrian competitions.

People
 Darragh Ennis, a chaser on ITV's The Chase
 Dermot Kennedy, singer-songwriter
 Paddy Reilly, folk singer and guitarist
 Michelle Smith who won three gold medals and a bronze medal at the 1996 Summer Olympic Games in Atlanta

Representation
Rathcoole is in the Dublin Mid-West constituency and in the Clondalkin local electoral area for county council elections (the area covers the area including Clondalkin, Newcastle and Saggart too).

Twinning
  École-Valentin,  France officially twinned since 14 April 2000.

See also
 List of towns and villages in Ireland

References

External links

Rathcoole Community Centre web site
Village web site
Rathcoole Boys Football Club
Coolmine Equestrian Centre
Commercials Hurling and Camogie Club

Towns and villages in South Dublin (county)
Civil parishes of Newcastle, County Dublin